Man Follows the Sun (translit. Chelovek idyot za solntsem) is a 1962 Soviet drama film directed by Mikhail Kalik.

Plot 
The film follows a little boy through the megacity (Chișinău) on his pursuit to get the sun, because, as another boy tells him that going straight he will be able to get the sun, walk around the globe, and return to the place of his departure but from a different side. The world of adults and the spaces they inhabit are viewed from a child's perspective.

Cast
 Nika Krimnus as Sandu  
 Yevgeniy Yevstigneyev as Nikolai Chernykh, motorcycle racer  
 Tatyana Bestayeva as Elya, motorcycle racer's wife 
 Anatoli Papanov as manager  
 Nikolay Volkov as lottery tickets seller 
 Georgiy Georgiu as Koka, hairdresser  
 Valentin Zubkov as military musician  
 Lev Kruglyy as truck driver 
 Valentina Telegina as woman reading a letter 
 Larisa Luzhina as Lenutsa   
 Dumitru Fusu as Rike, inspector of Militsiya 
 Maxim Grecov as Lev, shoeshiner 
 Viktor Markin as happy father 
 Georgios Sovchis as Prince of Orange, construction worker
 Georgiy Svetlani as fan de foot
 Iosif Levyanu as taxi driver

Reception
Administrative measures were taken against Mikhail Kalik because one brief erotic episode.

References

External links

1962 films
1962 in the Soviet Union
Soviet drama films
1960s Russian-language films
Films about children
Films set in the Soviet Union
1962 drama films
Russian children's drama films
1960s children's drama films
Soviet children's films